A teenager is a person between the ages of 13 and 19.

Teenager or teenagers may also refer to:

Music

Artists
 Teenager (band), an Australian alternative rock band
 The Teenagers, an American doo wop group established in 1954
 The Teenagers (French band), a French synthpop band formed in 2005

Albums
 Teenager (Fujifabric album), 2008
 Teenager (Jane Siberry album), 1996
 Teenager (The Thrills album), 2007

Songs
 "Teenager" (George Alice song), 2020
 "Teenager", 2007 song by Jordan Pruitt from the album No Ordinary Girl
 "Teenager", 1993 song by Better Than Ezra from the album Deluxe
 "Teenagers" (song), 2006 song by My Chemical Romance
 "Teenagers", 2009 song by Hayley Williams from the soundtrack Jennifer's Body

Film 
 Teenage (2013 American film), a 2013 documentary film
 Teenage (2013 Indian film), a 2013 Kannada film
 Teenager (film), a 2005 film by Yalkin Tuychiev
 The Teen Agers (1946–1948), a film series of campus comedies produced by Monogram
 Teenagers (film), a 1961 Egyptian film
 Teenagers (web series), a Canadian web series

See also 
 Adolescent (disambiguation)
 Teen (disambiguation)